Chaudhari Rehmatullah Aslam (b. January 15, 1913, d. July 10, 2007) was a Pakistani politician. Aslam was born in Shahkot, near Sheikhupura. During his student days, he was influenced by leftist ideas. In 1936, he completed his LLB degree. In 1940 he joined the Communist Party of India (later, his membership transferred to the Communist Party of Pakistan).

Aslam, who had been directed by the party to engage in trade union organizing, was arrested in 1948 and 1951. In 1954, the Communist Party was banned. Aslam joined the National Awami Party. In West Pakistan, he became a prominent personality of the Maulana Bhasani-wing of the NAP. In 1969 he launched the weekly Awami Jamhuriat ('People's Democracy'). In 1970, he took part in the founding of the Pakistan Socialist Party. After having advocated support for Balochi demands, Awami Jamhuriat was banned by the Bhutto government and Aslam was sent to jail.

In 1999 Aslam was one of the founders of the National Workers Party, and became a Central Committee member of the party.

References

External links
C R Aslam - 70 Years of Struggle

1913 births
2007 deaths
Communist Party of Pakistan politicians
Pakistani trade unionists